Lost Son or The Lost Son may refer to:
 The Lost Son (film), a 1999 crime drama
 The Lost Sons, a 2021 American-British documentary film
 Lost Son (novel), a 2007 novel by M. Allen Cunningham
 Lost Son (parable) or parable of the Prodigal Son, a parable of Jesus from the Bible
 Lost Son, a 1999 album by Richmond Fontaine
 "Lost Son", an episode of CSI: Miami

See also
 Parable of the Lost Coin
 Parable of the Lost Sheep
 The Prodigal Son (disambiguation)